Quissamã Futebol Clube, commonly known as Quissamã, was a Brazilian football club based in Quissamã, Rio de Janeiro state.

History
The club was founded on January 5, 1919. They won the Campeonato Carioca Third Level in 2008 and the Second Level in 2012. They competed in the Campeonato Carioca in 2013.

Achievements
 Campeonato Carioca Second Level:
 Winners (1): 2012
 Campeonato Carioca Third Level:
 Winners (1): 2008

Stadium
Quissamã Futebol Clube play their home games at Estádio Antônio Carneiro da Silva. The stadium has a maximum capacity of 3,000 people.

References

Association football clubs established in 1919
Football clubs in Rio de Janeiro (state)
1919 establishments in Brazil